Uchu Tatsumi (born January 23, 1972) is a retired Japanese mixed martial artist. He competed in the Bantamweight and Featherweight division. Tatsumi fought in Shooto and is known for his series of fights against Alexandre Franca Nogueira, from whom he suffered his only defeat ending his five year undefeated streak.

Mixed martial arts career
Uchu Tatsumi trained for Shooto under Kazuhiro Kusayanagi at K'z Factory.

Tatsumi debuted on May 12, 1995, winning a unanimous decision against Magnum Kawamura at Shooto: Vale Tudo Access 4. Throughout 1996, Tatsumi fought Kimihito Nonaka and Hisao Ikeda to bring his record to 3-0-1. His undefeated streak would continue throughout the following year, including a decision win over Mamoru Okochi at Shooto: Reconquista 1 on January 18, 1997. 

At 7-0, Tatsumi faced Joao Roque at the 1997 edition of Vale Tudo Japan, the fight went to a draw. On March 28, 1999, at Shooto: Renaxis 1, Tatsumi fought Noboru Asahi to a three round draw, keeping his streak alive.

At VTJ 1999, Tatsumi faced Alexandre Franca Nogueira for the Shooto Lightweight Championship the fight ended in a draw. He defeated Anthony Hamlett via rear naked choke at Shooto: R.E.A.D. 7 and then challenged Nogueira afterwards, promising that he would quit if he lost.

At the turn of the century and record standing 10-0-3, his rematch with Nogueira was soon granted. At Shooto: R.E.A.D. 9 on August 27, 2000, Tatsumi suffered his first defeat via rear naked choke in the first round. He retired as he had promised.

Tatsumi briefly broke his retirement and had a kickboxing match in 2016 at the age of 44 and retired after suffering a defeat.

Personal life
Tatsumi is a graduate of the University of Tokyo. In 2014, Tatsumi was diagnosed with bipolar disorder, he was hospitalized for two months in a manic state.

Mixed martial arts record

|-
| Loss
| align=center| 10-1-3
| Alexandre Franca Nogueira
| Submission (guillotine choke)
| Shooto: R.E.A.D. 9
| 
| align=center| 1
| align=center| 1:57
| Yokohama, Kanagawa, Japan
| 
|-
| Win
| align=center| 10-0-3
| Anthony Hamlett
| Submission (rear naked choke)
| Shooto: R.E.A.D. 7
| 
| align=center| 1
| align=center| 2:49
| Setagaya, Tokyo, Japan
| 
|-
| Draw
| align=center| 9-0-3
| Alexandre Franca Nogueira
| Draw
| VTJ 1999: Vale Tudo Japan 1999
| 
| align=center| 3
| align=center| 8:00
| Urayasu, Chiba, Japan
| 
|-
| Win
| align=center| 9-0-2
| Hisao Ikeda
| Decision (split)
| Shooto: Renaxis 4
| 
| align=center| 3
| align=center| 5:00
| Tokyo, Japan
| 
|-
| Draw
| align=center| 8-0-2
| Noboru Asahi
| Draw
| Shooto: Renaxis 1
| 
| align=center| 3
| align=center| 5:00
| Tokyo, Japan
| 
|-
| Win
| align=center| 8-0-1
| Eric Payne
| Submission (rear naked choke)
| Shooto: Las Grandes Viajes 6
| 
| align=center| 1
| align=center| 2:42
| Tokyo, Japan
| 
|-
| Draw
| align=center| 7-0-1
| Joao Roque
| Draw
| VTJ 1997: Vale Tudo Japan 1997
| 
| align=center| 3
| align=center| 8:00
| Urayasu, Chiba, Japan
| 
|-
| Win
| align=center| 7-0
| Paul Coonin
| Submission (heel hook)
| Shooto: Reconquista 4
| 
| align=center| 1
| align=center| 1:19
| Tokyo, Japan
| 
|-
| Win
| align=center| 6-0
| Abdelaziz Cherigui
| Submission (punches)
| Shooto: Reconquista 2
| 
| align=center| 1
| align=center| 2:18
| Tokyo, Japan
| 
|-
| Win
| align=center| 5-0
| Mamoru Okochi
| Decision (unanimous)
| Shooto: Reconquista 1
| 
| align=center| 5
| align=center| 3:00
| Tokyo, Japan
| 
|-
| Win
| align=center| 4-0
| Sunay Ahmed
| Submission (rear-naked choke)
| Shooto: Let's Get Lost
| 
| align=center| 1
| align=center| 0:51
| Tokyo, Japan
| 
|-
| Win
| align=center| 3-0
| Hisao Ikeda
| KO (punches)
| Shooto: Vale Tudo Junction 3
| 
| align=center| 1
| align=center| 0:47
| Tokyo, Japan
| 
|-
| Win
| align=center| 2-0
| Kimihito Nonaka
| Decision (majority)
| Shooto: Vale Tudo Junction 1
| 
| align=center| 3
| align=center| 3:00
| Tokyo, Japan
| 
|-
| Win
| align=center| 1-0
| Magnum Kawamura
| Decision (unanimous)
| Shooto: Vale Tudo Access 4
| 
| align=center| 3
| align=center| 3:00
| Japan
|

See also
List of male mixed martial artists

References

External links
 
 Uchu Tatsumi at mixedmartialarts.com
 Uchu Tatsumi at fightmatrix.com

1972 births
Japanese male mixed martial artists
Bantamweight mixed martial artists
Featherweight mixed martial artists
Mixed martial artists utilizing Shorinji Kempo
Living people